Old Union Church and Cemetery is a historic church and cemetery located in Reeve Township, Daviess County, Indiana. The church was built in 1858, and is a one-story, Greek Revival style frame building.  It is sheathed in clapboard and has a gable roof.  It features a projecting entrance tower added about 1900.  The adjacent cemetery contains about 1,000 burials; the earliest marked burial was in 1823.  Also on the property are the contributing shelter house and privy.

It was listed on the National Register of Historic Places in 2005.

References

External links

 

Churches on the National Register of Historic Places in Indiana
Greek Revival church buildings in Indiana
Churches completed in 1858
Churches in Daviess County, Indiana
National Register of Historic Places in Daviess County, Indiana
Cemeteries on the National Register of Historic Places in Indiana